Joseph Mooney (born 1979) is a New Zealand politician. In 2020 he was elected as a Member of Parliament in the House of Representatives for the National Party.

Early life and career
Mooney is originally from Hawke's Bay and grew up in poverty. At the age of 11, he and his younger brother left home and lived on the streets of Wellington for a week. He dropped out of high school without any qualifications and worked in a range of areas including "orchards, forestry, fishing boats, building sites, retail stores, and skifields". However, he later went to university where he obtained an honours degree in law. He became a senior trial lawyer and later a member of the Southland Branch Council of the New Zealand Law Society. In 2017 he was appointed by the Deputy Solicitor-General to the Crown Prosecution Panel for the Invercargill Crown Solicitor. He is also a court-appointed Youth Advocate.

Mooney has been a volunteer firefighter and army reservist.

Political career

Mooney was selected as the National Party candidate for the new Southland electorate in July 2020, following Hamish Walker's decision to leave Parliament after he admitted that he had leaked private patient information to the media. Mooney won preference over journalist Olivia Caldwell and Dunedin restaurant manager Matthew French. At the 2020 general election, he was elected to the Southland seat by a margin of 5,645 votes over Labour Party candidate Jon Mitchell. Labour, however, won the party vote in the electorate, with 38.7%. Mooney has identified the first issue he intends to deal with as an MP will be to get more seasonal workers "on the ground" to address the fruit-picking "crisis" in Central Otago. Mooney is one of five new National Party MPs in the 53rd Parliament.

From November 2020, Mooney has been National Party spokesperson for Treaty of Waitangi negotiations and associate spokesperson for defence. Since December 2021, after Christopher Luxon became the party leader, Mooney has additionally been spokesperson for water and space. He is currently a member of the Māori Affairs Committee and was formerly a member of the Regulations Review Committee from December 2021 to August 2022.

Personal life
Mooney and his wife Silvia have three children. He is an enthusiast of skiing and mountain biking. Former Labour MP Bill Fox is his great-great uncle.

References

|-

Living people
1979 births
21st-century New Zealand lawyers
New Zealand National Party MPs
New Zealand MPs for South Island electorates
Members of the New Zealand House of Representatives
21st-century New Zealand politicians
New Zealand firefighters